The following is a list of various comics, graphic novels, webcomics, and manga based on video games.

A

The Adventures of Bayou Billy

Among Us

Army of Two

B

Batman: Arkham

Bionic Commando

Bloodborne

BloodRayne

Borderlands

Bully

C

Call of Duty

Capcom

Captain Commando

Castlevania

Comics

Manga

Centipede

The Cheetahmen

Contra

Crash Bandicoot

Crysis

Cyberpunk 2077

D

Dark Souls

Darksiders

Darkstalkers

Comics

Manga

DC Universe Online

Defenders of Dynatron City

Deus Ex

Devil May Cry

Comics

Manga

Doom

Double Dragon

Dragon Age

Dragon Quest

Dragon's Lair

Duke Nukem

E

Earthworm Jim

F

Fallout

Fatal Fury

Final Fantasy

Final Fight

Five Nights at Freddy's

Flashback

G

Gauntlet

Gears of War

Ghosts 'n Goblins

God of War

H

Halo

Hellgate: London

Hotline Miami

I

Infamous

Injustice: Gods Among Us

Isle of the Dead

J

K

Kane & Lynch

Killer Instinct

The King of Fighters

Kingdom Come: Deliverance

Kingdom Hearts

Kirby

L

The Last of Us

Legacy of Kain

The Legend of Zelda

M

Mana

Mario

Mass Effect

Mega Man

Metal Gear

Metroid

Minecraft

Mirror's Edge

Mortal Kombat

N

O

P

Paprium

Perfect Dark

Persona

Pokémon

Primal

Primal Rage

Prototype

R

Rage

Rachet & Clank

Resident Evil

Comics

Manga and manhua

Resistance

S

Skullgirls

Samurai Shodown

Silent Hill

Sly Cooper

Sonic the Hedgehog

Space Quest

Star Fox

Star Ocean

Star Raiders

StarCraft

Street Fighter

Super Robot Wars

Swordquest

T

Team Fortress 2

Tekken

Toki

Tomb Raider

Touhou

Tron

Turok

TwinBee

U

Ultima

Uncharted

V

Virtua Fighter

Comics

Manga

W

Warcraft

Warlords

Watch Dogs

Werewolf: The Last Warrior

X

Y

Z

See also 
Lists of comics based on media
List of comics based on fiction
List of comics based on Hasbro properties
List of comics based on television programs
List of comics based on unproduced film projects
Lists of media based on video games
List of films based on video games
List of novels based on video games
List of television series based on video games
List of anime based on video games
Lists of media based on comics
List of films based on comics
List of novels based on comics
List of video games based on comics
List of television programs based on comics
Lists of films based on media
Lists of works of fiction made into feature films
List of short fiction made into feature films
List of plays adapted into feature films
List of films based on poems
List of films based on comic strips
List of films based on manga
List of films based on magazine articles
List of films based on toys
List of films based on video games
List of films based on television programs
List of live-action films based on cartoons and comics
Lists of media based on films
List of comics based on films
List of video games based on films
List of television programs based on films
Lists of video games based on media
List of video games based on anime or manga
List of video games based on cartoons
List of video games based on comics

References 

Lists of works based on video games
video games